Federal Highway 9 (Fed. 9) is a toll-free part of the federal highway corridors. It crosses the center of Nuevo León, from Allende, Nuevo León to Cadereyta, Nuevo León.

References

009